Göte Andersson (February 19, 1909 – May 12, 1975) was a Swedish water polo player who competed in the 1936 Summer Olympics.

In 1936 he was part of the Swedish team which finished seventh in the water polo tournament. He played five matches.

References
Olympic profile at sports-reference.com

1909 births
1975 deaths
Swedish male water polo players
Olympic water polo players of Sweden
Water polo players at the 1936 Summer Olympics